WJIC is a Christian radio station licensed to Zanesville, Ohio, broadcasting on 91.7 MHz FM.  The station is owned by VCY America.  WJIC is also heard in the Cambridge, Ohio area on 94.3 FM, through translator station W233AL.

Programming
WJIC's programming includes Christian Talk and Teaching programming including; Crosstalk, Worldview Weekend with Brannon Howse, Grace to You with John MacArthur, In Touch with Dr. Charles Stanley, Love Worth Finding with Adrian Rogers, Revive Our Hearts with Nancy Leigh DeMoss, The Alternative with Tony Evans, Liberty Council's Faith and Freedom Report, Thru the Bible with J. Vernon McGee, Joni and Friends, Unshackled!, and Moody Radio's Stories of Great Christians.

WJIC also airs a variety of vocal and instrumental traditional Christian Music, as well as children's programming such as Ranger Bill.

Translator
WJIC is also heard in the Cambridge, Ohio area through a translator on 94.3 FM.

See also
 VCY America
 Vic Eliason
 List of VCY America Radio Stations

References

External links
 VCY America official website
 

JIC
VCY America stations